The Wheeler-Thanhauser Orchid Collection and Species Bank is located within Christy Woods, an 17-acre (73,000 m2) property located on the southwest corner of the Ball State University campus in Muncie, Indiana, United States. Donated to Ball State University in 1971, the orchid collection is the largest college maintained orchid species collection in the United States.

History

In 2014, the Dr. Joe and Alice Rinard Orchid Greenhouse opened after a $1.35 million new construction to house the Wheeler-Thanhauser Orchid Collection. The building was mostly funded by Joe Rinard. The greenhouse is named after Rinard and his wife, Alice.

Greenhouse and Education

The greenhouse has the orchid collection, tropical displays, animal exhibits and more. It is 3,600 square feet in size. The greenhouse holds over 2,000 orchids and some other tropical plants. It is open the public, and is free of charge.

See also
 List of botanical gardens and arboretums in Indiana

References

External links
 

Botanical gardens in Indiana
Ball State University
Protected areas of Delaware County, Indiana
Tourist attractions in Muncie, Indiana
Buildings and structures in Muncie, Indiana